Heartlight is the fifteenth studio album by Neil Diamond. It was released in August 1982 on Columbia Records. The album spent 34 weeks on the charts and peaked at #9. For shipments of a million copies it was certified Platinum by the RIAA.

The title track, reportedly inspired by the 1982 film E.T. the Extra-Terrestrial,  peaked at #5 on the Billboard Hot 100 and #1 on the Hot Adult Contemporary Tracks chart in late 1982, while "I'm Alive" reached #35 on the Hot 100 in early 1983.  The song "Lost Among The Stars" has co-writer Burt Bacharach reproducing his melody from his hit "Trains and Boats and Planes" from 17 years prior.

The album was the last of a decade-long streak of Platinum albums by Diamond—he would not have another platinum album certified until his first Christmas album in the 1990s—and his last top 10 album for a decade. The song "Heartlight" was Diamond's last top 10 pop hit and also his last #1 on the Adult Contemporary chart, while "I'm Alive" was his last top 40 hit.  While Diamond continued having some success and periodic hits, and some television specials and film appearances, the period after Heartlight did not have for him the same level of sales, notoriety or fame that the preceding times did.

Billboard described "I'm Alive" as "a paean to dogged optimism" and said that "Handclaps and familiar chord changes recall the good old days of [Diamond's] earliest pop hits."

Track listing

Charts

Weekly charts

Year-end charts

Singles

Certifications

Personnel 
 Neil Diamond – lead vocals, guitar (uncredited)
 David Foster – Fender Rhodes (1, 3)
 Craig Hundley – synthesizers (1, 4, 6)
 Michael Boddicker – synthesizers (2, 6)
 Tom Hensley – acoustic piano (2, 5, 7, 8, 10), keyboards (2, 5, 7, 8, 10)
 Alan Lindgren – acoustic piano (2, 5, 7, 8, 10), synthesizers (2, 5, 7, 8, 10), orchestra arrangements and conductor (2, 8)
 Michael Omartian – acoustic piano (4)
 Michael Lang – acoustic piano (6), Fender Rhodes (9)
 Michael Masser – acoustic piano (11), arrangements (11)
 Marty Walsh – guitar (1, 4), acoustic guitar (9)
 Richard Bennett – acoustic guitar (2, 5, 7, 8, 10), electric guitar (2, 5, 7, 8, 10)
 Doug Rhone – acoustic guitar (2, 5, 7, 8, 10), electric guitar (2, 5, 7, 8, 10), backing vocals
 Dean Parks – guitar (3, 4), electric guitar (6, 9)
 Lee Ritenour – guitar (4)
 Fred Tackett – acoustic guitar (6)
 Neil Stubenhaus – bass (1, 4, 6, 9, 11)
 Reinie Press – bass (2, 3, 5, 7, 8, 10)
 Jim Keltner – drums (1, 3, 4, 6, 9)
 Ron Tutt – drums (2, 5, 7, 8, 10)
 Alex Acuña – drums (4)
 Mike Baird – drums (11)
 Paulinho da Costa – percussion (1, 4, 6)
 Vince Charles – percussion (2, 5, 7, 8, 10)
 King Errisson – percussion (2, 5, 7, 8, 10
 Victor Feldman – percussion (9)
 David Boruff – alto saxophone (3), Steinerfone electronic wind instrument (5)
 Burt Bacharach – orchestra arrangements and conductor (1, 3–6, 9), acoustic piano (3, 5, 9)
 Jeremy Lubbock – orchestra arrangements and conductor (11)
 Richard Page – backing vocals
 Linda Press – backing vocals
 Stephanie Spruill – backing vocals
 Julia Tillman Waters – backing vocals
 H.L. Voelker – backing vocals
 Maxine Waters Willard – backing vocals

Production 
 Producers – Neil Diamond (Tracks 1-6 & 8–10); Carole Bayer Sager (Tracks 1-6 & 9); Burt Bacharach (Tracks 1-6 & 9); Tom Hensley (Tracks 7 & 8); Richard Bennett (Track 10); Michael Masser (Track 11).
 Recording Engineers – Dick Bogart, Joel Fein, Lee Herschberg, Ric Riccio, Bill Schnee, Allen Sides and Jeremy Smith.
 Assistant Engineers – Michael Carver, Tony Chiappa, Steve Crimmel, Mark Ettel, Mike Hatcher, Clif Jones, Clyde Kaplan and Greg Russell.
 Recorded at Ocean Way Recording and A&M Studios (Hollywood, CA); The Village Recorder (Los Angeles, CA); Evergreen Studios (Burbank, CA).
 Mixing Engineers – Jim Behrendt, Steve Crimmel, Ron Hitchcock, Bill Schnee, Allen Sides and Jeremy Smith.
 Mixed at The Mix Room (Burbank, CA) and Ocean Way Recording.
 Mastered by Mike Reese at The Mastering Lab (Los Angeles, CA).
 Music Contractors – Jules Chakin, Frank DeCaro and John Rosenberg.
 Production Assistance – Barry Cardinale, Ann Mooney, Larry E. Williams and Alison Zanetos.
 Production Coordinator – Sam Cole
 Art Direction and Design – David Kirschner
 Design Contributing – Jan Weinberg
 Photography – Tom Bert

References

Neil Diamond albums
1982 albums
Albums produced by Burt Bacharach
Columbia Records albums
Albums recorded at United Western Recorders
Albums recorded at A&M Studios